The list of Underground Railroad sites includes abolitionist locations of sanctuary, support, and transport for former slaves in 19th century North America before and during the American Civil War. It also includes sites closely associated with people who worked to achieve personal freedom for all Americans in the movement to end slavery in the United States.

The list of validated or authenticated Underground Railroad and Network to Freedom sites is sorted within state or province, by location.

Canada

The Act Against Slavery of 1793 stated that any enslaved person would become free on arrival in Upper Canada. A network of routes led from the United States to Upper and Lower Canada.

Ontario
 Amherstburg Freedom Museum – Amherstburg. The museum uses historical artifacts, Black heritage exhibits, and video presentations to share the story of how Africans were forced into slavery and the made their way to Canada.
 Fort Malden – Amherstburg One of the routes to Ontario was to cross Lake Erie from Sandusky, Ohio to Fort Malden. Another route to Fort Malden was traveling across the Detroit River into Canada and then across to Amherstburg. A number of fugitive slaves lived in the area and Isaac J. Rice established himself as a missionary, operating a school for black children.
 Buxton National Historic Site and Elgin settlement – Chatham, Ontario The Elgin settlement was established by a Presbyterian minister, Reverend William King, with fifteen former slaved on November 28, 1849. King came from Ohio, where he inherited fourteen enslaved people from his father-in-law and acquired another and set them free. King intended Elgin settlement to a refuge for runaway enslaved people. The Buxton Mission was established at the settlement.
 Uncle Tom's Cabin Historic Site and Dawn Settlement – Dresden. Rev. Josiah Henson, a former enslaved man who fled slavery via the Underground Railroad with his wife Nancy and their children, was a cofounder of the Dawn Settlement in 1841. Dawn Settlement was designed to be a community for black refugees, where children and adults could receive an education and develop skills so that they could prosper. They exported tobacco, grain, and black walnut lumber to the United States and Britain.
 John R. Park Homestead Conservation Area – Essex. The Park Homestead was a station on the Underground Railroad.
 John Freeman Walls Historic Site – Lakeshore. John Freeman Walls, left his enslavers in North Carolina and settled in Canada. The Refugee Home Society supplied the money to buy land and he built a cabin. Church services were held there before the Puce Baptist Church was built. It was also a terminal stop on the Underground Railroad. Walls and his family stayed in Canada after the American Civil War.
 Queen's Bush – Mapleton. Beginning in 1820, African American pioneers settled in the open lands of Queen's Bush. More than 1,500 blacks set up farms and created a community with churches and Mount Pleasant and Mount Hope schools, which were taught by American missionaries.
 St. Catharines – Harriet Tubman lived in St. Catharines and attended the  Salem Chapel for ten years. After she freed herself from slavery, she helped other enslaved people reach freedom in Canada. The town was a final stop on the Underground Railroad for many people.
 Sandwich First Baptist Church – Windsor. The church was built just over the border from the United States in Windsor, Ontario by blacks who came to Canada to live free. For its role in the lives of its congregants and as a sanctuary for fugitive slaves, it was designated a National Historic Site in 1999.

Nova Scotia
African-American people settled in Nova Scotia since 1749.
 Birchtown National Historic Site – Birchtown. It was a settlement of black people from Colonial America, who served the British during the American Revolutionary War in exchange for their freedom. Birchtown was the largest community of free black people in British North America during the late 18th century.
 Africville – Halifax. Black people settled in Africville beginning in 1848. Black residents did not have the same services as white people, like clean water and sewers, and lived on land that was not arable. Some were able to make a living for themselves and build a community with a Baptist church, a school, stores, and a post office. A plan was initiated to relocate families and raze the site of the town.

United States

Colorado
 Barney L. Ford Building — Denver, associated with escaped slave Barney Ford, who became a quite successful businessman and led political action towards Black voting rights in Colorado. He used the Underground Railroad (UGRR) to flee slavery and supported UGRR activities.

Connecticut

 Francis Gillette House — Bloomfield
 Austin F. Williams Carriagehouse and House — Farmington. Built in the mid-19th century, the property was designated a National Historic Landmark for the role it played in the celebrated case of the Amistad Africans, and as a "station" on the Underground Railroad.
 First Church of Christ, Congregational — Farmington The church was a hub of the Underground Railroad, and became involved in the celebrated case of the African slaves who revolted on the Spanish vessel La Amistad. When the Africans who had participated in the revolt were released in 1841, they came to Farmington.
 Polly and William Wakeman House — Wilton. The Wakemans were among a group of abolitionists in Wilton who helped runaway slaves. Underneath their house was a tunnel that was accessed by a trap door. They took people on late-night trips to neighboring towns on the Underground Railroad.

Delaware

 Camden Friends Meetinghouse — Camden Quaker meeting house (built in 1806) of Camden Monthly Meeting, several of whose members were active in the Underground Railroad, including John Hunn, who is buried in its cemetery.
 John Dickinson Plantation — Dover
 New Castle Court House — New Castle 
 Appoquinimink Friends Meetinghouse — Odessa
 Corbit–Sharp House — Odessa
 The Tilly Escape site, Gateway to Freedom: Harriet Tubman's Daring Route through Seaford — Seaford
 Friends Meeting House — Wilmington
 Thomas Garrett House — Wilmington

District of Columbia
 Blanche K. Bruce House
 Camp Greene and Contraband Camp
 Frederick Douglass National Historic Site
 Howard University, Moorland-Spingarn Research Center
 Leonard Grimes Property Site
 Mary Ann Shadd Cary House
 Pearl incident at 7th Street Dock

Florida
 Negro Fort, also known as British Fort and Fort Gadsden — near Sumatra, Franklin County
 Fort Mosé — St. John's County

Georgia
 First African Baptist Church — Savannah
 Dr. Robert Collins House - William and Ellen Craft Escape Site (NRHP site) — Macon

Illinois

 Old Rock House — Alton
 New Philadelphia Town Site — Barry
 Quinn Chapel AME Church — Brooklyn
 Lucius Read House — Byron
 Galesburg Colony UGRR Freedom Station at Knox College — Galesburg
 Beecher Hall, Illinois College — Jacksonville
 Graue Mill — Oak Brook
 Dr. Hiram Rutherford House and Office — Oakland
Owen Lovejoy House — Princeton
 John Hossack House — Ottawa
 Dr. Richard Eells House — Quincy
 Maple Lane (Reverend Asa Turner House) – Quincy
 Mission Institute Number One – Quincy
 Mission Institute Number Two – Quincy
 Oakland (Dr. David Nelson House) – Quincy
 Blanchard Hall, Wheaton College — Wheaton

Indiana

 Levi Coffin House — Fountain City
 Bethel AME Church — Indianapolis
 Eleutherian College Classroom and Chapel Building — Lancaster
 Lyman and Asenath Hoyt House — Madison
 Madison Historic District — Madison
 Town Clock Church (now Second Baptist Church) — New Albany
 Quinn House, within Old Richmond Historic District — Richmond
 Phanuel Lutheran Church — Southeastern Fountain County

Iowa
 First Congregational Church — Burlington
 Horace Anthony House — Camanche
 Reverend George B. Hitchcock House — Lewis vicinity
 Henderson Lewelling House — Salem
 Todd House — Tabor
 Jordan House — West Des Moines

Kansas
 Fort Scott National Historic Site  — Bourbon County
 John Brown Cabin — Osawatomie

Maine
 Harriet Beecher Stowe House — Brunswick
 Abyssinian Meeting House — Portland

Maryland

 President Street Station — Baltimore
 Harriet Tubman's birthplace — Dorchester County
 Riley-Bolten House — North Bethesda
 John Brown's Headquarters — Sample's Manor

Massachusetts
 African American National Historic Site — Boston
 William Lloyd Garrison House — Boston
 Black Heritage Trail, including the Lewis and Harriet Hayden House — Boston
 William Ingersoll Bowditch House — Brookline
 Mount Auburn Cemetery — Cambridge
 The Wayside — Concord
 George Luther Stearns Estate — Medford
 Nathan and Mary Johnson House — New Bedford 
 Jackson Homestead — Newton
 Ross Farm — Northampton
 Dorsey–Jones House — Northampton
 Liberty Farm — Worcester

Michigan
 Guy Beckley — Ann Arbor. Underground Railroad promoter and station master and anti-slavery lecturer. The Guy Beckley House is on the Underground Railroad Network to Freedom.
 Erastus and Sarah Hussey — Battle Creek
 Second Baptist Church — Detroit
 Dr. Nathan M. Thomas House — Schoolcraft
 Wright Modlin  — Williamsville, Cass County. His house was a railroad station, but he often traveled south to the Ohio River (a border between the free and slave states) or into Kentucky where he found people escaping slavery and brought them up to Cass County. He was so successful that it angered Kentuckian slaveholders, who instigated the Kentucky raid on Cass County in 1847. He was also a central figure in The South Bend Fugitive Slave case.

Nebraska
 Mayhew Cabin — Nebraska City

New Jersey

 Holden Hilton House — Jersey City
 Thomas Vreeland Jackson and John Vreeland Jackson house — Jersey City
 Mott House — Lawnside Borough
 Red Maple Farm — Monmouth Junction
 Grimes Homestead — Mountain Lakes
 Rhoads Chapel — Saddlertown, Haddon Township 
 Bethel AME Church — Springtown
 Mortonson-Van Leer Log Cabin — Swedesboro
 Mount Zion African Methodist Episcopal Church — Woolwich Township

New York

 Edwin Weyburn Goodwin — Albany
 Stephen and Harriet Myers House — Albany
 Allegany County network: Baylies Bassett — Alfred and others (including Henry Crandall Home — Almond; William Sortore Farm — Belmont); Marcus Lucas Home — Corning; Thatcher Brothers — Hornell, McBurney House — Canisteo (now in town of Hornellsville); William Knight — Scio
 Harriet Tubman House and Thompson AME Zion Church — Auburn
 North Star Underground Railroad Museum — Ausable Chasm
 Michigan Street Baptist Church — Buffalo
 Cadiz, Franklinville area network: Merlin Mead House and others, including John Burlingame, Alfred Rice, Isaac Searle, and the owner of the Stagecoach Inn
 McClew Farm at Murphy Orchards — Burt

 St. James AME Zion Church — Ithaca

 John Brown Farm State Historic Site — Lake Placid

 Starr Clock Tinshop — Mexico
 Abolitionist Place — New York City: Brooklyn. Abolitionist Place is a section of Duffield Street in downtown Brooklyn that used to be a center of anti-slavery and Underground Railroad activity. New York City was one of the busiest ports in the world in the 19th century. Some freedom seekers traveled aboard ships amongst cargo, like tobacco or cotton from the Southern United States and arrived in Brooklyn a few blocks away from Abolitionist Place. Underground Railroad conductors helped these freedom seekers, as well as people who traveled north on the Underground Railroad. They were provided needed shelter, like at the Plymouth Church of the Pilgrims; clothing; and food.
 Plymouth Church of the Pilgrims — New York City: Brooklyn

 Niagara Falls Underground Railroad Heritage Center — Niagara Falls

Chappaqua Friends Meeting House - Chappaqua, New York
 Buckout-Jones Building — Oswego
 Edwin W. and Charlotte Clarke House — Oswego
 Hamilton and Rhoda Littlefield House — Oswego
 John B. and Lydia Edwards House — Oswego
 John Jay Homestead - Bedford/Katonah
 Orson Ames House — Mexico, Oswego County
 Oswego Market House — Oswego
 Oswego School District Public Library (presumably the Oswego City Library) — Oswego
 Richardson-Bates House Museum — Oswego
 Tudor E. Grant — Oswego
 
 Gerrit Smith Estate and Land Office — Peterboro
 Smithfield Community Center — Peterboro, formerly a church; first meeting of New York Anti-Slavery Society held there; houses National Abolition Hall of Fame and Museum.
 Samuel and Elizabeth Cuyler House Site — Pultneyville

 Foster Memorial AME Zion Church — Tarrytown

 Eber Pettit Home - Versailles

North Carolina
 Guilford College Woods meeting place, Guilford College — Greensboro
 Freedmen's Colony of Roanoke Island Network to Freedom site — Manteo, Outer Banks

Ohio

Col. William Hubbard House — Ashtabula
Captain Jonathan Stone House — Belpre
Harriet Beecher Stowe House — Cincinnati
 House of Peter and Sarah M. Fossett — Cincinnati / Cumminsville
Samuel and Sally Wilson House — Cincinnati

James and Sophia Clemens Farmstead — Greenville

Sawyer–Curtis House — Little Hocking
 
Mount Pleasant Historic District — Mt. Pleasant

 Reuben Benedict House — Marengo
Spring Hill — Massillon
Wilson Bruce Evans House — Oberlin

John P. Parker House — Ripley
John Rankin House — Ripley
Daniel Howell Hise House — Salem
Rush R. Sloane House — Sandusky

 George W. Adams House /  Prospect Place — Trinway
Iberia — Washington Township, Morrow County
Putnam Historic District — Zanesville

Pennsylvania

 Kaufman's Station — Boiling Springs

 Oakdale — Chadds Ford
 John Brown House — Chambersburg 

 Dobbin House — Gettysburg

 Thaddeus Stevens Home and Law Office – Lancaster

 Johnson House — Philadelphia
 Hosanna Meeting House — Chester County
 Liberty Bell, Independence National Historical Park — Philadelphia
 White Horse Farm — Phoenixville
 Hovenden House, Barn and Abolition Hall — Plymouth Meeting
 Bethel AME Zion Church — Reading

 F. Julius LeMoyne House — Washington
 William Goodrich House — York
 Eusebius Barnard House — Pocopson

Rhode Island
 Isaac Rice Homestead — Newport

Tennessee

 Burkle Estate was possibly a station and is now Slave Haven Underground Railroad Museum  — Memphis 
 Hunt-Phelan House — Memphis

Texas
 Matilda and Nathaniel Jackson
 Silvia and John Webber

Vermont
 Rowland E. Robinson House, Rokeby — Ferrisburgh

Virgin Islands
 Annaberg Sugar Plantation and School — St. John

Virginia
 Bruin's Slave Jail — Alexandria
 Rochelle–Prince House / Nat Turner Historic District — Courtland
 Moncure Conway House — Falmouth
 Theodore Roosevelt Island — Rosslyn
 Fort Monroe — Hampton

West Virginia
 Z. D. Ramsdell House — Ceredo
 Jefferson County Courthouse — Charles Town
 Harpers Ferry National Historical Park — Harpers Ferry
 Wheeling Hotel — Wheeling

Wisconsin
 Milton House — Milton
 Joshua Glover — Milwaukee
 Lyman Goodnow — Waukesha. Conductor, led 16-year-old Caroline Quarlls, the first known freedom seeker along Wisconsin's Underground Railroad, from Wisconsin to Canada.

Other articles and references

See also
 Index: Underground Railroad locations
 National Underground Railroad Freedom Center
The Underground Railroad Records
 Underground Railroad Bicycle Route

References

Bibliography

External links

Map of Underground Railroad locations
 A Photographic Journey Along the Underground Railroad
 American abolitionists

 01
Underground Railroad sites
American Civil War sites
Underground Railroad sites
Secret places in the United States
African American-related lists
Underground Railroad